Greensfelder County Park consists of  in western St. Louis County, Missouri. It is located in the city of Wildwood and bordered to the south by the Eureka and Six Flags St. Louis. Greensfelder is part of the Henry Shaw Ozark Corridor. The park's land was donated to St. Louis County in 1963 by the trustees of the St. Louis Regional Planning and Construction Foundation, which had been established in 1939 by Albert P. Greensfelder. The park was originally named Rockwood Park, but was renamed in 1965 in honor of A.P. Greensfelder.

The park has a nature center, playgrounds pavilions, scenic loop road, stables, a campsite, and eight trails open to hiking, mountain biking, and horseback riding.

References

Protected areas of St. Louis County, Missouri
Parks in Missouri
Protected areas established in 1963
1963 establishments in Missouri